Petr Koukal (born 16 August 1982) is a Czech professional ice hockey player who is currently playing for HK Hradec Kralove in the Czech Extraliga (ELH). He participated at the 2010 IIHF World Championship as a member of the Czech Republic National men's ice hockey team.

His older brother Martin is a cross-country skiing world champion.

Career statistics

Regular season and playoffs

International

References

External links
 

1982 births
Living people
Avtomobilist Yekaterinburg players
Czech ice hockey forwards
HC Dynamo Pardubice players
Jokerit players
Stadion Hradec Králové players
HC Neftekhimik Nizhnekamsk players
HC Plzeň players
People from Žďár nad Sázavou
Ice hockey players at the 2018 Winter Olympics
Olympic ice hockey players of the Czech Republic
Sportspeople from the Vysočina Region
Czech expatriate ice hockey players in Finland
Czech expatriate ice hockey players in Russia